Silicon Valley is a nickname for the southern portion of the San Francisco Bay Area in the United States.

Silicon Valley may also refer to:

Places
 Silicon Valley of China (disambiguation)
 Silicon Valley of India, nickname of the Indian city of Bangalore
 Silicon Valley of Turkey, proposed project for the Turkish version of the Silicon Valley
 Silicon Valley Computer Group Philippines, a computer retail store in the Philippines
 Space Station Silicon Valley, a console game
 Silicon Valley North, used to describe Ottawa during the dot com boom of the 1990s.

Other uses
 Silicon Valley (TV series), 2014 American television sitcom

See also
 German Silicon Valley (disambiguation)
 Russian Silicon Valley (disambiguation)
 Silicon Alley, an area with a high concentration of high-tech industries in New York City
 Silicone Valley, a nickname for the San Fernando Valley, the center of the U.S. pornographic industry
 Silicon Wadi, an area with a high concentration of high-tech industries in Israel